Sir Simon Russell Beale  (born 12 January 1961) is an English actor. He is known for his performances in film, television and theatre. He's received numerous accolades including two BAFTA Awards, three Olivier Awards, and a Tony Award. For his services to drama, he was knighted by Queen Elizabeth II in 2019. Beale has been described by The Independent as "the greatest stage actor of his generation". 

Beale started his acting career at the Royal Shakespeare Company and National Theatre. He has received ten Laurence Olivier Award nominations, winning three awards for his performances in Volpone (1996), Candide (2000), and Uncle Vanya (2003). For his work on the Broadway stage he has received a Tony Award for Best Actor in a Play nomination for his performance as George in the Tom Stoppard play Jumpers in 2004. For his role as Henry Lehman in The Lehman Trilogy, he won the Tony Award for Best Actor in a Play and was nominated for an Olivier Award. 

Beale made his film debut in Sally Potter's period drama Orlando (1992). He gained prominence for his roles in Persuasion (1995), Hamlet (1996), My Week with Marilyn (2011), The Deep Blue Sea (2011), Mary Queen of Scots (2018), Benediction (2021), and The Outfit (2022). In 2017, he portrayed Lavrentiy Beria in Armando Iannucci's The Death of Stalin for which he received the British Independent Film Award for Best Supporting Actor. 

He has also appeared in the television projects The Young Visiters (2003), Dunkirk (2004), and Vanity Fair (2018). He earned two British Academy Television Awards one for Best Actor for A Dance to the Music of Time (1998), and the other for Best Supporting Actor for Henry IV, Part I and Part II (2012). From 2014 to 2016, he was part of the main cast of Showtime's Penny Dreadful.

Early years 
Beale was born on 12 January 1961, one of six children of Captain, later Lieutenant General, Sir Peter Beale and his wife Julia née Winter. He was born in Penang, Malaya, where his father was serving in the Army Medical Services. His father later, from 1991 to 1994, served as Surgeon-General of HM Armed Forces. Several other members of Beale's family have pursued successful careers in medicine.

Beale was first drawn to performance when, at the age of eight, he became a chorister at St. Paul's Cathedral and a pupil at the adjoining St Paul's Cathedral School. His secondary education was undertaken at the independent Clifton College in Bristol.

His first stage performance was as Hippolyta in A Midsummer Night's Dream at primary school. In the sixth form at Clifton he also performed in Rosencrantz and Guildenstern Are Dead, a play in which he would later star at the National Theatre.

After Clifton, he went to Gonville and Caius College, Cambridge, and obtained a first in English, after which he was offered a place to undertake a PhD. He pursued further studies at Guildhall School of Music and Drama, graduating in 1983.

Career

Early work 
Beale first came to the attention of theatre-goers in the late 1980s with a series of lauded comic performances, which were on occasion extremely camp, in such plays as The Man of Mode by George Etherege and Restoration by Edward Bond at the Royal Shakespeare Company (RSC). He broadened his range in the early 1990s with moving performances as Konstantin in Chekhov's The Seagull, as Oswald in Ibsen's Ghosts, Ferdinand in The Duchess of Malfi and as Edgar in King Lear. At the first annual Ian Charleson Awards in January 1991, he received a special commendation for his 1990 performances of Konstantin in The Seagull, Thersites in Troilus and Cressida and Edward II in Edward II, all at the RSC.

It was at the RSC that he first worked with Sam Mendes, who directed him as Thersites in Troilus and Cressida, as Richard III and as Ariel in The Tempest, in the last of which he revealed a fine tenor voice. Mendes also directed him as Iago in Othello at the Royal National Theatre and in Mendes's farewell productions at the Donmar Warehouse in 2002, Chekhov's Uncle Vanya, in which Beale played the title role, and Twelfth Night, in which he played Malvolio. He won the 2003 Laurence Olivier Award for Uncle Vanya.

Since 1995, he has been a regular at the National Theatre, where his roles have included Mosca in Ben Jonson's Volpone opposite Michael Gambon, George in Tom Stoppard's Jumpers and the lead in Humble Boy by Charlotte Jones, a part written specially for him. In 1997, he played the pivotal role of Kenneth Widmerpool in a television adaptation of Anthony Powell's A Dance to the Music of Time, for which he won the Best Actor award at the British Academy Television Awards in 1998. The following year, he was a key part of Trevor Nunn's ensemble, playing in Leonard Bernstein's Candide (Voltaire/Pangloss), Edward Bulwer-Lytton's Money and Maxim Gorky's Summerfolk at the National. In autumn 2006, he played Galileo in David Hare's adaption of Brecht's Life of Galileo and as Face in The Alchemist.

2000s 
In 2000, he played Hamlet in a production directed by John Caird for the National Theatre, a role for which he was described by The Daily Telegraph as "portly [and] relatively long in the tooth". In 2005, Beale was directed by Deborah Warner as Cassius in Julius Caesar alongside Ralph Fiennes as Antony. That same year, he played the title role in Macbeth at the Almeida Theatre. In 2007, he reprised his 2005 Broadway role as King Arthur in the Monty Python musical Spamalot at the Palace Theatre, London.

From December 2007 to March 2008, he played Benedick in Much Ado About Nothing directed by Nicholas Hytner at the National Theatre and from February to July 2008, he played Andrew Undershaft in Hytner's production of Shaw's Major Barbara; he then appeared in Harold Pinter's A Slight Ache and Landscape.

In 2008, he made his debut as a television presenter, fronting the BBC series Sacred Music with Harry Christophers and The Sixteen. Various specials and a second series have since been produced; the most recent episode (Monteverdi in Mantua: The Genius of the Vespers) was broadcast in 2015. In spring 2009, Beale and Sam Mendes collaborated on The Winter's Tale and The Cherry Orchard, in which Beale played Leontes and Lopakhin respectively, at the Brooklyn Academy of Music, later transferring to the Old Vic Theatre.

From 2009 to 2010, he played George Smiley in the BBC Radio 4 adaptation of all the John le Carré novels in which Smiley featured. These were broadcast in nineteen 90-minute or 60-minute full cast radio plays. From March to June 2010, he played Sir Harcourt Courtly in London Assurance, again at the National. In August 2010, he appeared in the first West End revival of Deathtrap by Ira Levin. In March 2011, he made his debut with The Royal Ballet in Alice's Adventures in Wonderland as the Duchess. In October 2011, he returned to the National to star as Joseph Stalin in the premiere of Collaborators, for which he won Best Actor at the 2012 Evening Standard Awards.

2010s 
In 2010–11, Beale played the Coalition Home Secretary William Towers in the two final series of BBC One's spy drama, Spooks. He played the title role in Timon of Athens at the National Theatre from July to October 2012. The production was broadcast to cinemas around the world (as was Collaborators earlier) on 1 November 2012 through the National Theatre Live programme. He starred in a revival of Peter Nichols' Privates on Parade as part of Michael Grandage's new West End season at the Noël Coward Theatre from December 2012 to March 2013.

In 2013, he won the British Academy Television Award (BAFTA) for Best Supporting Actor for his performance as Falstaff in the BBC's The Hollow Crown series of TV films about Shakespeare's historical dramas Richard II; Henry IV, Part 1; Henry IV, Part 2; and Henry V. That same year he appeared in National Theatre Live: 50 Years On Stage (2013).

Beale appeared alongside John Simm in Harold Pinter's The Hothouse at the Trafalgar Studios from May to August 2013, directed by Jamie Lloyd. From January 2014, he played the title role in King Lear at the National Theatre, directed once again by Sam Mendes. Also from 2014 to 2016 he starred as a main cast member in Showtime's Penny Dreadful, in which he played an eccentric Egyptologist. In 2014, Beale was appointed the Cameron Mackintosh Professor of Contemporary Theatre at Oxford University, based at St Catherine's College.

From May to July 2015, he starred in Temple, a new play at the Donmar Warehouse about the 2011 United Kingdom anti-austerity protests. In September and October 2015, he played Samuel Foote in Mr Foote's Other Leg at the Hampstead Theatre. It transferred to the Theatre Royal Haymarket from October 2015 to January 2016.

In November 2016, Beale returned to the Royal Shakespeare Company in Stratford-upon-Avon, to play Prospero in The Tempest. In June 2017, it transferred to the Barbican Centre in London. In July 2018, Beale returned to the National, starring opposite Ben Miles and Adam Godley in The Lehman Trilogy, again directed by Mendes. It transferred to the Piccadilly Theatre in the West End in May 2019. Beale starred in the title role of Richard II at the Almeida Theatre from December 2018 to February 2019.

2020s 
During the COVID-19 pandemic, Beale contributed as a guest speaker to The Show Must Go Online's performance of Timon of Athens.

In the summer of 2021, Beale played JS Bach in the world première of Nina Raine's Bach and Sons, directed by frequent collaborator Nicholas Hytner at his company's Bridge Theatre in London.

During this time he re-rehearsed for the post-COVID return in late September of the Broadway transfer of the National Theatre production of The Lehman Trilogy whose run had been halted on 12 March 2020 by the pandemic. Beale reprised his role (along with Adam Godley) but, due to stage commitments in London for the RSC in the third part of the Wolf Hall trilogy, Ben Miles was replaced by Adrian Lester. Beale won a Tony Award for Best Actor in a Play for his performance in The Lehman Trilogy.

Personal life 
Beale is a past president of the Anthony Powell Society, a tribute to his portrayal of Kenneth Widmerpool.

Beale is gay. In the Independent on Sunday 2006 Pink List – a list of the most influential gay men and women in the UK – he was placed at number 30.

He was knighted by Queen Elizabeth II, at Buckingham Palace, on 9 October 2019.

Acting credits

Film

Television

Theatre 
Selected credits:

 Also appeared as Sir Politic Wouldbe, Volpone; title role, Richard III; and in The Man of Mode; Troilus and Cressida; Die Hose, Traverse Theatre; The Death of Elias Sawney, Traverse Theatre; Sandro Manon, Traverse Theatre; Look to the Rainbow, Apollo Theatre; Women Beware Women, Royal Court Theatre; A Winter's Tale; Everyman in His Humour; The Art of Success; The Fair Maid of the West; Speculators; The Storm; The Constant Couple; Restoration; Some Americans Abroad; Mary and Lizzie; Playing with Trains; Edward II; Love's Labour's Lost; King Lear; Ghosts; Candide; Summerfolk.

Patronage 
Beale is a patron of the following organisations:
 English Touring Theatre
 South London Theatre
 London Symphony Chorus
 For Short Theatre Company
 Diamond Fund for Choristers

Awards and honours 

 2003 – Appointed a CBE in the 2003 Birthday Honours
 2005 – Hon DLitt (Warwick)
 2010 – Honorary Bencher of Middle Temple
 2010 – Hon DUniv (Open University)
 2011 – Honorary Freedom of the City of London for services to drama
 2015 – Cameron Mackintosh Visiting Professor of Contemporary Theatre, St. Catherine's College, Oxford
 2018 – Premio Shakespeare Award
 2019 – Made a Knight Bachelor in the 2019 Birthday Honours for services to drama

Further reading 
 Trowbridge, Simon, The Company: A Biographical Dictionary of the Royal Shakespeare Company, Oxford: Editions Albert Creed, 2010. .

References

External links 

 
 
 National Theatre: Platforms
 Russell Beale news
 Broadway.com Interview
 The Company: A Biographical Dictionary of the RSC: Online database
 Debrett's People of Today

1961 births
Living people
20th-century English male actors
20th-century LGBT people
21st-century English male actors
21st-century LGBT people
Actors awarded knighthoods
Alumni of Gonville and Caius College, Cambridge
Alumni of the Guildhall School of Music and Drama
Audiobook narrators
Best Actor BAFTA Award (television) winners
Best Supporting Actor BAFTA Award (television) winners
Commanders of the Order of the British Empire
Critics' Circle Theatre Award winners
English gay actors
English male film actors
English male musical theatre actors
English male radio actors
English male Shakespearean actors
English male stage actors
English male television actors
English male voice actors
English music historians
English people of Malaysian descent
English television presenters
Fellows of St Catherine's College, Oxford
Knights Bachelor
Laurence Olivier Award winners
People educated at Clifton College
People educated at St. Paul's Cathedral School
People associated with the University of Warwick
People associated with the Open University
People from Penang
Royal Shakespeare Company members
Tony Award winners